Pravit Wasoontra is a retired professional footballer from Thailand.

References

Living people
Pravit Wasoontra
1981 births
Association football forwards
Pravit Wasoontra